Pleasant View is a commuter rail station in Pleasant View, Utah, formerly served by the FrontRunner, Utah Transit Authority's (UTA) commuter rail train that operates along the Wasatch Front with service from Ogden in central Weber County through Davis County, Salt Lake City, and Salt Lake County to Provo in central Utah County.

UTA announced that FrontRunner service to and from the Pleasant View station was to be suspended indefinitely with the schedule valid from August 12, 2018. As trains to Pleasant View station only operated Monday to Friday, the last train operated August 10, 2018. The reason given for the suspension of service was the cost of implementing federally mandated positive train control for the section of track north of Ogden on which FrontRunner ran, but is owned by the Union Pacific Railroad (UP).

Description

The station is located at 2700 North US Highway 89 (US-89) and can be easily accessed from either 2700 North (Utah State Route 134) or US-89. There are about 300 parking spaces in its free park and ride lot. The station is located within the quiet zone, so trains do not routinely sound their horns when approaching public crossings within this corridor.

Prior to truncation, the FrontRunner provided limited service to and from Pleasant View station. While nearly all trains originated or terminated in at the Ogden Intermodal Transit Center in Ogden each weekday there was service to Pleasant View with two trains picking up passengers in the morning and two more dropping off and picking up passengers in the evening for the commute.

In addition to rail service there is a UTA bus route that provides more frequent service to the Ogden Intermodal Transit Center. The UTA bus connection runs hourly for the morning and evening commute, with no mid-day service.

One major reason for limited operation at this station was that the FrontRunner trains had to operate on trackage owned by UP and sharing it with UP freights. Between Ogden and Provo, the FrontRunner has its own dedicated trackage separate from (but parallel to) UP tracks. UTA originally planned to open the station along with the rest of the original start of the FrontRunner service in April 2008, but necessary improvements to the shared stretch of track owned by UP were delayed when railroad workers were diverted to repair tracks damaged by a landslide near Oakridge, Oregon. The station finally opened for service on September 29, 2008. Originally, only two trains serviced each weekday for the morning and evening commutes. However, service was eventually increased to six trains daily before the FrontRunner service was temporarily discontinued on September 6, 2011. Limited service was restored on December 10, 2012, but then cancelled in 2018.

Future extension
Service on the FrontRunner is planned to extend further north to Brigham City, which would resume service to this station.

References

External links

Railway stations in the United States opened in 2008
UTA FrontRunner stations
Transportation in Weber County, Utah
2008 establishments in Utah
Railway stations in Weber County, Utah
Pleasant View, Utah
Railway stations closed in 2018